Ngaire Smith (born 18 April 1979 in Melbourne, Victoria) is a former field hockey midfield and forward player from Australia, who earned a total number of 97 international caps for the Women's National Team, in which she scored 22 goals. Nicknamed Nige, she made her debut for the Australian Senior Team at the 2001 East Asian Games. In the AHL Smith played for the Azuma Vipers.

International senior competitions
 2001 – Champions Trophy, Amstelveen, Netherlands (3rd)
 2002 – Commonwealth Games, Manchester, United Kingdom (3rd)
 2002 – Champions Trophy, Macau, China (4th)
 2002 – World Cup, Perth, Australia (4th)
 2003 – Champions Trophy, Sydney, Australia (1st)
 2004 – Champions Trophy, Rosario, Argentina (4th)

References
 Profile on Hockey Australia

1979 births
Living people
Australian female field hockey players
Sportswomen from Victoria (Australia)
Commonwealth Games bronze medallists for Australia
Field hockey players from Melbourne
Commonwealth Games medallists in field hockey
Field hockey players at the 2002 Commonwealth Games
Medallists at the 2002 Commonwealth Games